Waves Breaking is a 1881 canvas by the French Impressionist painter Claude Monet (1840–1926).It was painted on the coast of Normandy  and follows the example of Gustave Courbet's marine paintings as in having been executed with the painter having faced out toward the sea.  The work is held at Legion of Honor which is part of the Fine Arts Museums of San Francisco. 
It's considered a work of Marine art.

See also
List of paintings by Claude Monet

References

1881 paintings
Maritime paintings
Paintings by Claude Monet